Mark H. Gehan (February 28, 1892 – June 23, 1967) was an American lawyer and politician.

Gehan was born in Saint Paul, Minnesota and lived in Saint Paul with his wife and family. He served in the United States Army during World War I. Gehan received his law degree from William Mitchell College of Law (formerly St. Paul College of Law). He practiced law in Saint Paul, Minnesota. Gehan served in the Minnesota House of Representatives from 1923 to 1928. He then served as Mayor of Saint Paul, Minnesota from 1943 to 1938. He died in Saint Paul, Minnesota and was buried in Fort Snelling National Cemetery.

References

1892 births
1967 deaths
Mayors of Saint Paul, Minnesota
Military personnel from Minnesota
Minnesota lawyers
William Mitchell College of Law alumni
Members of the Minnesota House of Representatives